John Whelan may refer to:

Seán Ó Faoláin (1900–1991), Irish short story writer, born as John Francis Whelan
John Whelan (Irish politician) (born 1961), Irish Labour Party politician
John W. Whelan (1845–1906), American lawyer, farmer, and politician
John "Rocky" Whelan (died 1855), English bushranger and serial killer in Van Diemen's Land, now Tasmania, Australia

See also

Jack Whelan (disambiguation)